The 48th Infantry Brigade, was raised as   the 48 Indian Infantry Brigade,  in October 1941, at Secunderabad, India.  After an initial tenure with   19th Indian Infantry Division, it was transferred to the 17th Indian Infantry Division. In World War II it participated in the Burma campaign and in   April 1942 was  attached  to 1st Burma Division. After the war  the brigade returned to India  as an independent brigade, and was located at Dhond in August 1947. After  India gained Independence in 1947,  48 Indian Infantry Brigade was re-designated as 48 Infantry Brigade.  Since then 48 infantry brigade has seen action  Goa in  1961,  as part of 17 Infantry  Division;  in the 1962 War  in Kameng Frontier Division,  Arunachal Pradesh,  as part of 4th Infantry Division;  and in the 1971 war, as part of 7th Infantry Division.  Since the  1970s,  48  Infantry Brigade has been  located in Ferozpur, Punjab, as part of 7 Infantry Division.

World War II
During the war the following Units  were under the Brigade: 
1st Battalion, 3rd Gurkha Rifles October 1941 to June 1942
1st Battalion, 4th Gurkha Rifles October 1941 to March 1943
2nd Battalion, 5th Gurkha Rifles May 1943 to September 1944
1st Battalion, 7th Gurkha Rifles February to August 1945
1st Battalion, 10th Gurkha Rifles April 1942
5th Battalion, 17th Dogra Regiment February to March 1942
8th Battalion, Burma Rifles February 1942
3rd Battalion, Burma Rifles February 1942
1st Battalion, Cameronians (Scottish Rifles) March to April 1942
4th Battalion, 12th Frontier Force Regiment January to October 1943 and March 1944 and January to August 1945
9th Battalion, Border Regiment July 1943 to August 1944
1st Battalion, West Yorkshire Regiment August 1944 to August 1945

1962 War

Following the Chinese offensive on 20 October 1962, the 48 Infantry Brigade  was rushed from the plains  to reinforce  4 Infantry Division (Dirang Dzong), defenses in Kameng.  4 Corps Commander was Lt General BM Kaul, and the  GOC 4 Infantry Division was Major General Pathania. The following units  served under the brigade during the war: 1st Battalion the Madras Regiment,  1 Sikh LI,  5 Guards,  and troop  7 Cavalry( light tanks), 377 Field Company(engineers).   On 19 November, just when the battle of Bomdila was unraveling, 3 Jammu & Kashmir Rifles (Lieutenant Colonel Gurdial Singh) and 22 Mountain Regiment, 6/8 Gorkha Rifles  and  67 Brigade joined the brigade.   The Brigade  reached Bomdila  without its full complement of  weapons, equipment and men.    Every thing was in short supply.  There was just  50 rounds of 1st line ammunition for every rifle.  The Brigade lacked  supporting weapons, including  according to its commander, "3" mortars,  digging tools, barbed wire, mines, or even machetes to clear the jungle". The Commander of 48 Infantry Brigade was Gurbux Singh, who at the age of 94,  recalling  the battle of Bomdila, said like many veterans of that war,  that  "The war saw a failure of military and political leadership of the country. Our intelligence, too, was not very good... In any case I don't see why we are opening these old wounds. Why are we wallowing in our defeat. It was a bad show, we should forget it and move on".

See also

 List of Indian Army Brigades in World War II

References

Military history of India
History of the Indian Army
Infantry brigades of the Indian Army after 1947
Military units and formations established in 1941